Nelia is a 2021 Philippine suspense thriller film directed by Lester Dimaranan under A and Q Productions Film starring Winwyn Marquez.

Premise
A nurse attempts to uncover information about the mysterious deaths of patients in Room 009 in a hospital.

Cast
Winwyn Marquez as Nelia Katigbak
Raymond Bagatsing
Ali Forbes
Mon Confiado
Shido Roxas
Lloyd Samartino
Dexter Doria
Dan Alvaro

Production
Nelia was produced under A and Q Productions Film with Lester Dimaranan as its director. Melanie Honey Quiño wrote the screenplay for Nelia in the mid-2000s, when she was still a student.

A and Q originally intended to produce educational films but these plans were cancelled because of the COVID-19 pandemic. Instead, the production studio pursued making Nelia to help film industry workers who were greatly impacted by the pandemic. While A and Q presented the film in honor of medical frontliners, it insisted that the fact the film's fictional story featuring medical workers was merely coincidental. Aside from centering on doctors and nurses, the film also touched upon mental health. For this purpose, the production team consulted with psychiatrists on relevant subject matters such as schizophrenia. Co-producer and screenwriter Quiño hoped that it would encourage people to seek professional help when it comes to mental health issues. Filming took place in Gapan, Nueva Ecija.

Release
Nelia is set to be released in the Philippines on December 25, 2021, as one of the official entries of the 2021 Metro Manila Film Festival. A film company based in Los Angeles, California has expressed interest to secure distribution rights for Nelia in the United States.

Possible remake
Two South Korean production companies have expressed intent to create a film adaptation of Nelia.

References

Philippine thriller films
Films about nurses
Films about schizophrenia